is a 1950 black-and-white Japanese film directed by Torajiro Saito.

Cast
 Hibari Misora

See also
 List of films in the public domain in the United States

References

Japanese black-and-white films
1950 films
Films directed by Torajiro Saito
Shochiku films
1950s Japanese films